Russula albidoflava is a fungus in the family, Russulaceae, found "in stands of Eucalyptus globulus" in Tasmania.

It was first described in 2007 by Teresa Lebel and Jennifer Tonkin.

References

albidoflava
Taxa named by Teresa Lebel